Fetterman may refer to:

People
Adam Fetterman (born 1970), attorney and Democratic politician, representative for District 81 of the Florida House of Representatives during 2008–2009
I. P. Fetterman (1887–1924), American racecar driver who participated in the 1922 Indianapolis 500
John Fetterman (born 1969), American politician and current U.S. senator from Pennsylvania
Gisele Barreto Fetterman (born 1982), American activist and nonprofit executive
John Fetterman (reporter) (1920–1975), American journalist, a reporter for The Courier-Journal newspaper of Louisville, Kentucky
Kenneth Fetterman, scammer who sold very expensive counterfeit art on rigged auctions on eBay
William J. Fetterman (1833–1866), United States Army officer during the American Civil War and in the Red Cloud's War on the Great Plains

Places
Fort Fetterman, wooden fort constructed in 1867 by the United States Army on the Great Plains frontier in the Dakota Territory
Fetterman, West Virginia, an unincorporated community located in Taylor County, West Virginia

Other
Fetterman Fight, a battle during Red Cloud's War in 1866, between the Lakota, Cheyenne, and Arapaho Indians and the United States Army

See also

Lundy–Fetterman School of Business, American business school founded in 1983 and located in Buies Creek, North Carolina
 
Terman (disambiguation)